The Scout and Guide movement in Nigeria is served by
 The Nigerian Girl Guides Association, member of the World Association of Girl Guides and Girl Scouts
 Scout Association of Nigeria, member of the World Organization of the Scout Movement

International Scout units in Nigeria
In addition, there are American Boy Scouts in Lagos, linked to the Direct Service branch of the Boy Scouts of America, which supports units around the world. Scout of Nigeria is the largest youth and Adult movement which trained a person to be a responsible citizen and to be a self reliance

See also